"The Number One Song in Heaven" is a disco song by the American rock duo Sparks. Released as a single in 1979, the song was produced and co-written by electro-disco producer Giorgio Moroder. It became a top 20 hit in the UK, where it peaked at number 14. In addition to the standard black vinyl, both the 7" and 12" versions of the single were issued in a variety of coloured vinyl releases (red, blue, and green).

Sparks rerecorded the song in 1997, one version of which featured vocals by Jimmy Somerville and orchestrations by  Tony Visconti. This version peaked at number 70 in the UK, but was slightly more successful on the U.S. Billboard Dance Chart where it became a top 30 hit.

Music videos
The video for the 1997 version involves an angel singing with Satan trying to stop a ferris wheel, which pays homage to The Third Man.

Track listing

1979 release
7 inch Virgin VS 244
 "The Number One Song in Heaven" — 3:48
 "The Number One Song in Heaven" (Long Version) — 6:56
12 inch Virgin VS 244-12
 "The Number One Song in Heaven" — 4:02
 "The Number One Song in Heaven" (Long Version) — 7:27

1997 release
CD Single 1
 "The Number One Song In Heaven" (Sparks Radio Edit) — 3:28
 "The Number One Song In Heaven" (Extended Version With Jimmy Somerville) — 5:16
 "The Number One Song In Heaven" (Part Two) — 4:05
CD Single 2
 "The Number One Song In Heaven" (Sparks Radio Edit) — 3:28
 "The Number One Song In Heaven" (Tin Tin Out Mix) — 8:15
 "The Number One Song In Heaven" (Heavenly Dub) — 8:15
 "The Number One Song In Heaven" (Tin Tin Out Instrumental) — 9:14

Personnel
 Ron Mael - keyboards, synthesiser, vocals
 Russell Mael - vocals
 Chris Bennett - backing vocals
 Keith Forsey - drums
 Jack Moran - backing vocals
 Giorgio Moroder - synthesiser, vocoder
 Dan Wyman - synthesiser programming
 Dennis Young - backing vocals

Charts
1979 original release

1997 rerecording

In other media
The song was featured in the closing credits of the 2013 film Alan Partridge: Alpha Papa.

References

External links
Audio only video with extended lyrics and Short version each on the band's official YouTube channel

1979 songs
1979 singles
1997 singles
Sparks (band) songs
Songs written by Giorgio Moroder
Songs written by Ron Mael
Songs written by Russell Mael
Song recordings produced by Giorgio Moroder
Music videos directed by Bruce Gowers
Disco songs